The Black Angels is the eponymous debut EP released by psychedelic rock band The Black Angels in October 2005 on the Light In The Attic Records label.

Track listing 

 "Black Grease" - 4:35
 "The First Vietnamese War" - 3:33
 "Winter '68" - 2:41
 "Manipulation" - 5:57

Appearances
 "Black Grease" is heard on the fictional radio station Vinewood Boulevard Radio in the 2013 action-adventure video game Grand Theft Auto V.
 "The First Vietnamese War" was featured in the 2012 third-person shooter video game Spec Ops: The Line.

References 

The Black Angels (band) albums
2005 EPs
Light in the Attic Records albums